"Show You Love" is a song by Danish DJ Kato and British DJ Sigala. It features the vocals of American singer Hailee Steinfeld. The song is a re-release of the 2015 single with vocals by Grace Tither instead of Steinfeld.

Track listing

Charts

Certifications

References 

2017 singles
2017 songs
Hailee Steinfeld songs
Sigala songs
Songs written by Sigala
Virgin Records singles